The Great Lakes freighter SS Scotiadoc was a  long,  wide, and  deep, dry bulk freighter of typical construction style for the early 1900s, primarily designed for the iron ore, coal, and grain trades on the Great Lakes.  Commissioned by the Lakewood Steamship Co. of Cleveland, Ohio, SS Martin Mullen was launched as hull number 422 by American Ship Building Co. of Columbus.

Career
Martin Mullen made frequent trips to and from Duluth-area ports. She was purchased by Paterson Steamships in 1947 and renamed Scotiadoc.

Final voyage
Scotiadoc was rammed by Canadian steamer Burlington in heavy fog on June 20, 1953, off Trowbridge Island, near the Sleeping Giant in Lake Superior. One crew member died. Burlington collided with the starboard side of Scotiadoc near the stern.

Discovery of shipwreck
Shipwreck hunters found the wreck in 2013.

References

Further reading
Scanner Midsummer 1997 (#236)

1904 ships
Great Lakes freighters
Ships built in Cleveland
Ships sunk in collisions
Shipwrecks of Lake Superior
2013 archaeological discoveries
Shipwreck discoveries by Jerry Eliason, Ken Merryman and Kraig Smith